Taejo of Joseon (11 October 1335 – 24 May 1408), born Yi Seong-gye, later Yi Dan, was the founder and first ruler of the Joseon dynasty of Korea. He ascended to the throne in 1392, after being the main figure in the overthrowing of the Goryeo dynasty. Taejo abdicated in 1398 during a strife between his sons and died in 1408.

When Taejo became king, he emphasized continuity over change. No new institutions and no massive purges occurred during his reign. The dynasty that he installed was mostly dominated by the same ruling families and officials that had served the previous regime. He re-established amicable relations with Japan and improved relations with Ming China.

Biography

Early life
Taejo's father was Yi Ja-chun, an official of Korean ethnicity serving the Mongol-led Yuan dynasty. Taejo's mother, Lady Choe, was of Chinese origin from a prominent family originally from Deungju (Anbyeon County) in present-day North Korea. Her father was a Korean chiliarch under the Yuan dynasty who commanded a mingghan. She later moved to Hamgyong, in Goryeo.

Historical context
By the late 14th century, the 400-year-old Goryeo dynasty established by Wang Geon in 918 was tottering, its foundations collapsing from years of war and de facto occupation by the disintegrating Mongol Empire. The legitimacy of Korea itself was also becoming an increasingly disputed issue within the court, as the ruling house failed not only to govern the kingdom effectively, but was also affected by generations of forced intermarriage with members of the Yuan imperial family and by rivalry amongst various branches of the royal family, with King U's mother being a known commoner, thus leading to rumors disputing his descent from King Gongmin.

Within the kingdom, influential aristocrats, generals, and ministers struggled for royal favor and vied for domination of the court, resulting in deep divisions among various factions. With the ever-increasing number of raids against Goryeo conducted by Japanese pirates (widely known as wokou) and the Red Turbans, those who came to dominate the royal court were the reformed-minded Sinjin aristocracy and the opposing Gweonmun aristocracy, as well as generals who could actually fight off the foreign threats—namely Yi Seong-gye and his rival Choe Yeong. As the Ming dynasty started to emerge, the Yuan forces became more vulnerable, and by the 1350s, Goryeo regained its full independence, although Yuan remnants effectively occupied northeastern territories with large garrisons of troops.

Military career
Yi Seong-gye started his career as a military officer in 1360, and would eventually rise up the ranks of the Goryeo army. In October 1361, he killed Park Ui, who rebelled against the government. In the same year, when the Red Turbans had invaded and captured Gaegyeong, he helped the recapture of the capital with 3,000 men. In 1362, when General Naghachu invaded Goryeo, Yi Seong-gye was appointed as a commander and defeated him.

General Yi had gained power and respect during the late 1370s and early 1380s by pushing Mongol remnants off the peninsula and also by repelling the well-organized Japanese pirates in a series of successful engagements. Following in the wake of the rise of the Ming dynasty under Zhu Yuanzhang (the Hongwu Emperor), the royal court in Goryeo split into two competing factions: the group led by General Yi (supporting the Ming) and the camp led by General Choe (supporting the Yuan).

When a Ming messenger came to Goryeo in 1388 (14th year of King U) to demand the return of a significant portion of Goryeo's northern territory, General Choe seized the opportunity and played upon the prevailing anti-Ming atmosphere to argue for the invasion of the Liaodong Peninsula (Goryeo claimed to be the successor of the ancient kingdom of Goguryeo; as such, restoring Manchuria as part of Korean territory was a tenet of its foreign policy throughout its history).

A staunchly opposed Yi Seong-gye was chosen to lead the invasion; however, at Wihwa Island on the Amrok River, he made a momentous decision known as the Wihwado Retreat (위화도 회군, 威化島 回軍; lit. "Turning back from Wihwa Island" or "Return from Wihwa Island"), which would alter the course of Korean history. Knowing of the support he enjoyed both from high-ranking government officials and the general populace, he decided to revolt and return back to Gaegyeong to secure control of the government.

Yi Seong-gye remains the last Korean ruler with a military background up until the 20th century.

Revolt
General Yi swept his army from the Amrok River straight into the capital, defeated forces loyal to the king (led by General Choe, whom he proceeded to eliminate), and forcibly dethroned King U in a de facto coup d'état, but did not ascend to the throne right away. Instead, he placed on the throne King U's eight-years-old son, King Chang, and following a failed restoration attempt of the former monarch, had both of them put to death. Yi Seong-gye, now the undisputed power behind the throne, soon forcibly had a distant royal relative named Wang Yo (posthumously King Gongyang) crowned as the new ruler. After indirectly enforcing his grasp on the royal court through the puppet king, he proceeded to ally himself with Sinjin aristocrats such as Jeong Do-jeon and Jo Jun.

One of the most widely known events that occurred during this period was in 1392, when one of Yi Seong-gye's sons, Yi Bang-won, organized a party for the renowned scholar and statesman Jeong Mong-ju, who refused to be won over by General Yi despite their numerous correspondences in the form of archaic poems, and continued to be a faithful supporter of the old dynasty. Jeong Mong-ju was revered throughout Goryeo, even by Yi Bang-won himself, but in the eyes of the supporters of the new dynasty he was seen as an obstacle which had to be removed. After the party, he was killed by five men on the Seonjuk Bridge. This bridge has now become a national monument in North Korea, and a brown spot on one of the stones is said to be one of Jeong Mong-ju's bloodstains that turns red when it rains.

Reign
In 1392 (4th year of King Gongyang's reign), Yi Seong-gye forced the king to abdicate, exiled him to Wonju (where he and his family were secretly executed), and crowned himself as the new monarch, thus ending Goryeo's 475 years of rule. In 1393, he changed his dynasty's name to Joseon.

One of his early achievements was the improvement of relations with the Ming; this had its origin in Taejo's refusal to attack their neighbour in response to raids from Chinese bandits. Shortly after his accession, he sent envoys to inform the court at Nanjing that a dynastic change had taken place. Envoys were also dispatched to Japan, seeking the re-establishment of amicable relations. The mission was successful, and Shōgun Ashikaga Yoshimitsu was reported to have been favorably impressed by this embassy. Envoys from the Ryūkyū Kingdom were received in 1392, 1394 and 1397, as well as from Siam in 1393.

In 1394, the new capital was established at Hanseong (present-day Seoul).

When the new dynasty was officially promulgated, the issue of which son would be the successor was brought up. Although Yi Bang-won, Taejo's fifth son by his first wife Queen Sinui, had contributed the most to assisting his father's rise to power, he harbored a profound hatred against two of Taejo's key allies in the court, Jeong Do-jeon and Nam Eun.

Both sides were fully aware of the mutual animosity and constantly felt threatened. When it became clear that Yi Bang-won was the most worthy successor to the throne, Jeong Do-jeon used his influence to convince the king that the wisest choice would be the son that he loved most, not the son that he felt was best for the kingdom.

In 1392, the eighth son of King Taejo (the second son of Queen Sindeok), Yi Bang-seok was appointed as crown prince. After the sudden death of the queen in 1396 and while Taejo was still in mourning for his second wife, Jeong Do-jeon began conspiring to pre-emptively kill Yi Bang-won and his brothers to secure his position in court.

In 1398, upon hearing of this plan, Yi Bang-won immediately revolted and raided the palace, killing Jeong Do-jeon, his followers, and the two sons of the late Queen Sindeok. This incident became known as the "First Strife of Princes" (제1차 왕자의 난). Aghast at the fact that his sons were willing to kill each other for the throne and psychologically exhausted by the death of his second wife, Taejo immediately crowned his second son Yi Bang-gwa (posthumously King Jeongjong), as the new ruler.

Thereafter, Taejo retired to the Hamhung Royal Villa and maintained distance with his fifth son for the rest of his life. Allegedly, Yi Bang-won sent emissaries numerous times, and each time the former king killed them to express his firm decision not to meet his son again. This historical anecdote gave birth to the term "Hamhung Chasa" (함흥차사, 咸興差使), which means a person who never comes back despite several nudges. However, recent studies have found that Taejo did not actually kill any of the emissaries. Those subjects were killed during revolts, which coincidentally occurred in the Hamhung region.

In 1400, King Jeongjong pronounced his younger brother Yi Bang-won as heir presumptive and voluntarily abdicated. That same year, Yi Bang-won assumed the throne of Joseon at long (posthumously King Taejong).

King Taejo died ten years after his abdication, on 24 May 1408, in Changdeok Palace. He was buried at Geonwonneung (건원릉), Dongguneung Cluster, in the city of Guri, Gyeonggi Province, South Korea. The tomb of his umbilical cord is in Geumsan County, South Chungcheong Province, also in South Korea.

Family
 Father: Yi Ja-chun, King Hwanjo of Joseon (조선 환조 이자춘) (1315 – 18 April 1360)
 Grandfather: Yi Chun, King Dojo of Joseon (조선 도조 이춘) (? – 24 July 1342)
 Grandmother: Queen Gyeongsun of the Munju Park clan (경순왕후 박씨)
 Mother: Queen Uihye of the Yeongheung Choe clan (의혜왕후 최씨)
 Grandfather: Choe Han-gi (최한기)
 Grandmother: Grand Madame Yi of the Joseon State (조선국대부인 이씨)
Consorts and their respective issue(s):
 Queen Sinui of the Cheongju Han clan (신의왕후 한씨) (September 1337 – 23 September 1391)
 Yi Bang-u, Grand Prince Jinan (진안대군 이방우) (1354 – 15 January 1394), first son
 Yi Bang-gwa, Grand Prince Yeongan (영안대군 이방과) (26 July 1357 – 24 October 1419), second son
 Yi Bang-ui, Grand Prince Ikan (익안대군 이방의) (1360 – 29 October 1404), third son
 Yi Bang-gan, Grand Prince Hoean (회안대군 이방간) (1364 – 10 April 1421), fourth son
 Yi Bang-won, Grand Prince Jeongan (정안대군 이방원) (13 June 1367 – 8 June 1422), fifth son
Yi Bang-yeon, Grand Prince Deokan (덕안대군 이방연) (1370 – 1388), sixth son
 Princess Gyeongshin (경신공주) (? – 22 March 1426), second daughter
 Princess Gyeongseon (경선공주), third daughter
 Queen Sindeok of the Goksan Gang clan (신덕왕후 강씨) (14 June 1356 – 13 August 1396)
 Princess Gyeongsun (경순공주) (? – 1407), first daughter
 Yi Bang-beon, Grand Prince Muan (무안대군 이방번) (1381 – 6 October 1398), seventh son
 Yi Bang-seok, Grand Prince Uian (의안대군 이방석) (1382 – 6 October 1398), eighth son
 Consort Seong of the Wonju Won clan (성비 원씨) (? – 1449)
 Royal Lady Jeonggyeong of the Goheung Yu clan (정경궁주 유씨)
 Princess Hwaui of the Gim clan (화의옹주 김씨) (? – 1428)
 Princess Sukshin (숙신옹주) (? – 1453), fifth daughter
 Lady Chandeok of the Ju clan (찬덕 주씨)
 Princess Uiryeong (의령옹주) (? – 1466), fourth daughter
 Palace Lady Gim (궁인 김씨)

Ancestry

One of the many issues demonstrating the early strained relationship between Joseon and Ming was the debate of Taejo's genealogy, which began as early as 1394 and became a sort of diplomatic friction that lasted over 200 years. The Collected Regulations of the Great Ming erroneously recorded "Yi Dan" (Taejo's personal name) as the son of Yi In-im, and that Yi Dan killed the last four kings of Goryeo, thereby establishing Ming's opinion of Taejo as an usurper first and foremost, from the time of the Hongwu Emperor when he repeatedly refused to acknowledge him as the new sovereign of the Korean Peninsula. The first mention of this error was in 1518 (about 9 years after the publication), and those who saw the publication made petitions towards Ming demanding for redress, among others Left Chanseong Yi Gye-maeng and Minister of Rites Nam Gon, who wrote Jonggye Byeonmu (종계변무, 宗系辨誣). It took until 1584 (after many Ming envoys had seen the petitions), through Chief Scholar Hwang Jeong-uk, that the issue was finally addressed. The Wanli Emperor commissioned a second edition in 1576 (covering the years between 1479 and 1584). About a year after its completion, Yu Hong saw the revision, and returned to Joseon with the good news.

Legacy
Despite the fact that he overthrew Goryeo and purged officials who remained loyal to the previous dynasty, many regard him as a revolutionary and a decisive ruler who deposed the inept, obsolete and crippled governing system to save the nation from many foreign forces and conflicts.

Safeguarding domestic security led the Koreans to rebuild and further discover their culture. In the midst of the rival Yuan and Ming dynasties, Joseon encouraged the development of national identity which was once threatened by the Mongols. However, some scholars, particularly in North Korea, view Taejo as a mere traitor to the old regime and bourgeois apostate, while paralleling him to General Choe Yeong, a military elite who conservatively served Goryeo to death.

His diplomatic policy successes in securing Korea in the early modern period is notable.

In popular culture
 Portrayed by Im Dong-jin in the 1983 KBS TV series Foundation of the Kingdom.
 Portrayed by Kim Mu-saeng in the 1983 MBC TV series The King of Chudong Palace and in the 1996 KBS TV series Tears of the Dragon.
 Portrayed by Lee Jin-woo in the 2005–2006 MBC TV series Shin Don.
 Portrayed by Oh Jae-moo in the 2012 SBS TV series Faith.
 Portrayed by Ji Jin-hee in the 2012–2013 SBS TV series The Great Seer.
 Portrayed by Yoo Dong-geun in the 2014 KBS1 TV series Jeong Do-jeon.
 Portrayed by Lee Dae-yeon in the 2014 film The Pirates.
 Portrayed by Lee Do-kyung in the 2015 JTBC TV series More Than a Maid.
 Portrayed by Son Byong-ho in the 2015 film Empire of Lust.
 Portrayed by Chun Ho-jin in the 2015–2016 SBS TV series Six Flying Dragons.
 Portrayed by Kim Ki-hyeon in the 2016 KBS1 TV series Jang Yeong-sil.
 Portrayed by Lim Jong-yun in the 2016 film Seondal: The Man Who Sells the River.
 Portrayed by Kim Yeong-cheol in the 2019 JTBC TV series My Country: The New Age and 2021 KBS1 TV series The King of Tears, Lee Bang-won.
 Portrayed in the Mobile/PC Game Rise of Kingdoms.

See also

 List of monarchs of Korea
House of Yi

References

Notes

Sources

 
 Goodrich, Luther Carrington and Fang, Zhaoying. (1976).  Dictionary of Ming biography, 1368-1644 (明代名人傳), Vol. I;  Dictionary of Ming biography, 1368-1644 (明代名人傳), Vol. II.  New York: Columbia University Press. ; ; 
 Hussain, Tariq. (2006). Diamond Dilemma: Shaping Korea for the 21st Century. (다이아몬드딜레마). Seoul: Random House. 10-1-430-30641-6/; OCLC 180102797; OCLC 67712109 
 Kang, Jae-eun and Lee, Suzanne. (2006). The Land of Scholars : Two Thousand Years of Korean Confucianism. Paramus, New Jersey: Homa & Sekey Books. ; OCLC 60931394
 Titsingh, Isaac, ed. (1834). Nipon o daï itsi ran; Annales des empereurs du Japon. (compiled by Hayashi Gahō in 1652). Paris: Oriental Translation Fund of Great Britain and Ireland. OCLC 251800045 

Joseon rulers
Joseon Buddhists
Korean Buddhist monarchs
1335 births
1408 deaths
14th-century Korean people
Goryeo Buddhists
Korean generals
14th-century monarchs in Asia
Founding monarchs
People from Kumya County